HMS Nymphe was a Nymphe-class composite screw sloop and the fifth ship of the Royal Navy to bear the name. She was renamed HMS Wildfire in 1906, HMS Gannet in 1916, and finally HMS Pembroke in 1917, before she was sold in 1920.

Construction and service history
Developed and constructed for the Royal Navy on a design by William Henry White, Director of Naval Construction, she was launched at Sheerness Dockyard on 1 May 1888.

Commander Richard Bowles Farquhar was in command until 16 February 1900, when she paid off at Portsmouth for repairs.

Fate
From August 1914 she was a shore training ship at Sheerness, was later renamed Wildfire and was sold to Ward of Milford Haven for breaking in February 1920.

References 

 
 

 

Nymphe-class sloops
Ships built in Portsmouth
1888 ships
Victorian-era sloops of the United Kingdom
Royal Navy shore establishments